Vlachovice  is a municipality and village in Zlín District in the Zlín Region of the Czech Republic. It has about 1,500 inhabitants.

Administrative parts
The village of Vrbětice is an administrative part of Vlachovice.

History
In 2014, a series of explosions occurred in a military warehouse in the village of Vrbětice. Presumably, the explosion was caused by the Russian GRU agents.

References

Villages in Zlín District